Hubert Perring (born 19 January 1957) is a French equestrian. He competed in two events at the 2008 Summer Olympics.

References

External links
 

1957 births
Living people
French male equestrians
French dressage riders
Olympic equestrians of France
Equestrians at the 2008 Summer Olympics
Sportspeople from Auxerre
21st-century French people